Nungara is a genus of spiders in the family Sparassidae. It was first described in 2016 by Pinto & Rheims. , it contains four species from Ecuador, French Guiana and Brazil.

References

Sparassidae
Araneomorphae genera
Spiders of South America